Tan Chuk Hang is a village of Hong Kong, located in Fanling, North District. It comprises Tan Chuk Hang Lo Wai and Tan Chuk Hang San Wai (aka. Sheung Tan Chuk Hang).

Administration
Tan Chuk Hang is a recognized village under the New Territories Small House Policy. For electoral purposes, it is part of the Queen's Hill constituency of the North District Council. It is currently represented by Law Ting-tak, who was elected in the local elections.

History
Tan Chuk Hang Lo Wai is a walled village that was probably established before 1688.

Tan Chuk Hang is part of the Four Yeuk, which comprises Loi Tung, Lung Yeuk Tau, Lin Ma Hang and Tan Chuk Hang. The centre of the Alliance is the Hung Shing Temple at Hung Leng.

At the time of the 1911 census, the population of Sheung Tan Chuk Hang was 102. The number of males was 43.

See also
 Walled villages of Hong Kong

References

Further reading
 Agreement No. CE 45/2008 (CE) Liantang / Heung Yuen Wai Boundary Control Point and Associated Works -Environmental Impact Assessment Report. Appendix 12.2f: Detailed Records of Identified Built Heritage Features within CHIA Study Area of the Lau Shui Heung Tunnel Section (South Tunnel)

External links

 Delineation of area of existing village Tan Chuk Hang (Fanling) for election of resident representative (2019 to 2022)

Walled villages of Hong Kong
Fanling
Villages in North District, Hong Kong